Tibet University (UTibet) is a public university in Lhasa, Tibet, China. The university is one of China's key universities and the largest university in the Tibet Autonomous Region. With an internationally renowned department of Tibetan studies and a majority ethnic Tibetan student body, the university maintains a focus on local communities and cultures.

The school has four campuses in Lhasa: Na Jin campus, He Ba Lin campus, Financial School campus, and Medical School campus.

History 
The precursors to Tibet University were informal classes established by Tibetan cadres in 1951.

In May 1983, the State Council of the People's Republic of China officially approved the creation of the University of Tibet on the basis of the existing Teachers College in Lhasa. Tibet University was formally established on 20 July 1985.

Since 1999, various institutions of higher education, including the art school of the Tibet Autonomous Region, the Tibet Medical College, the Medical Department of the Tibet Institute for Nationalities and the Tibet Autonomous Region Finance School have all been incorporated into Tibet University, giving it a more rounded profile of academic departments.

In December 2008, Tibet University was selected as a beneficiary of the national Project 211. In 2017, the university was included by the central government of China in the Double First Class University Plan, with Double First Class University identity.

Student life 

About 7,500 students are enrolled at the university. Nearly 20% of students study in the renowned Department of Tibetan Studies, which draws international students as well as locals, although the majority of instruction is delivered in Chinese. The university requires all students to pass a Tibetan language examination before graduation.

As of 1995, 92% of the university's students are from ethnic minority groups, though ethnic Tibetans form only 67% of the student body and other groups of ethnic minorities have a significant presence.

TU started accepting foreign students in 1993. They can learn Tibetan as a foreign language and enroll in specific courses such as Tibetan music and fine arts.

Administration 
Lhasa campus of the existing staff of 863 people which includes 523 full-time teachers. Out of the 523 teachers, 327 are Tibetan, accounting for 62.5%. There are approximately 14,020 students.

The school has 14 colleges: the College of Humanities, College of Science, the College of Engineering, the College of Agronomy, the College of Medicine, the School of Economics and Management, the School of Tourism and Foreign Languages, the Teachers' College, the School of Continuing Education, the Central Radio and TV Tibet Institute, the School of Political Science and Law, the School of Marxism, the School of Finance and Management, and the School of Arts.

References

External links 
  

 
Universities and colleges in Tibet
Educational institutions established in 1985
Buildings and structures in Lhasa
Nyingchi
1985 establishments in China
Education in Lhasa